Henry Thomas Fox-Strangways, 2nd Earl of Ilchester (29 July 1747 – 5 September 1802), known as Lord Stavordale from 1756 to 1776, was a British peer and Member of Parliament.

Life 
Ilchester was the eldest son of Stephen Fox-Strangways, 1st Earl of Ilchester, and his wife, the former Elizabeth Horner. Henry Fox, 1st Baron Holland, was his uncle. He was educated at Eton (1760–1764) and Christ Church, Oxford (1765).

He was elected to the House of Commons for Midhurst, Sussex in 1768 (along with his cousin Charles James Fox), a seat he retained until 1774. Two years later he succeeded his father as second Earl of Ilchester and took his seat in the House of Lords.

He bought an army commission in 1770 and was made a captain in the 24th Regiment of Foot, but in 1775 when the regiment was sent to America he resigned his commission.

Detailed information about the Ilchester household and family survives in the published diaries and correspondence of Agnes Porter, a Scottish-born governess to his many daughters from 1784 to 1797. The family's previous governess had been Jane Gardiner, a childhood friend of Mary Wollstonecraft.

Marriages and issue
He married twice:
Firstly, in 1772, to Mary Theresa O'Grady (died 1792), a daughter of Standish O'Grady, by whom he had two sons and six daughters, including:
Henry Fox-Strangways, 3rd Earl of Ilchester, eldest son and heir
Louisa, 5th daughter (d.1851), married in 1808 Henry Petty-Fitzmaurice, later 3rd Marquess of Lansdowne
Secondly, in 1794, he married Maria Digby, a daughter of Rev. William Digby, Dean of Worcester, Dean of Durham, an Honorary Chaplain to the King, younger brother of Henry Digby, 1st Earl Digby, and first cousin of Charles James Fox. By Maria Digby he had three sons, including:
John George Charles Fox-Strangways (1803–1859), third son, whose mural monument survives in the Ilchester Chapel of All Saints Church, Farley, Wiltshire.

Death and succession
He died in September 1802, aged 55, and was succeeded by his son from his first marriage, Henry Fox-Strangways, 3rd Earl of Ilchester.

Arms

The arms of the head of the Fox-Strangways family are blazoned Quarterly of four: 1st & 4th: Sable, two lions passant paly of six argent and gules (Strangways); 2nd & 3rd: Ermine, on a chevron azure three foxes' heads and necks erased or on a canton of the second a fleur-de-lys of the third (Fox).

A Funerary hatchment of Henry Fox-Strangways, 2nd Earl of Ilchester, in the Ilchester Chapel at Farley, shows his quartered arms impaling dexter O'Grady (Per pale gules and sable, three lions passant guardant in pale per pale argent and or) and sinister Digby (Azure, a fleur-de-lys argent) quartering FitzGerald.

References

Further reading
Kidd, Charles; Williamson, David (editors). Debrett's Peerage and Baronetage (1990 edition). New York: St Martin's Press, 1990.

1747 births
1802 deaths
British MPs 1768–1774
Earls of Ilchester
Fox-Strangways, Henry Thomas
Henry